Kaamos was a Swedish death metal band that was formed in 1998 and disbanded in 2006. The band's name comes from the Finnish word for polar night.

History
They wrote three songs that were recorded on a cassette in 1999. Two of the songs were released by Dauthus on a limited 7”. After the release, bassist, singer Johan departed the band and was replaced by Karl.

In 2000, drummer Thomas called it quits. A new drummer was found in Cristofer Barkensjö (also known as Chris Piss). They wrote five new songs which they recorded as the demo Curse of Aeons, released in 2001. Kaamos chose to sign with Candlelight Records out of several label offers.

In November 2001 Kaamos entered the SubSonic studios again to record their debut album. With the aid of Messiah Marcolin nine tracks were recorded in ten days. The self-titled album was released in May 2002. Throughout 2002–2003 the band focused on performing live in several countries in Europe.

In March 2004 Kaamos entered the Berno studio and ten new songs were recorded. The second album, Lucifer Rising was released in February 2005 on Candlelight. After the release, Kaamos focused on playing live again. In 2006, the band announced their break up.
Just before that they recorded five final songs, that were released after the band's demise. The resulting MCD was titled Scales of Leviathan and small Greek label Nuclear Winter records released this MCD as a limited digipak and standard jewel case CD.

After their dissolution Papavassilou formed doom metal band Head Of The Demon in 2012 with original Kaamos drummer, Thomas Åberg. Envall, Eriksson, and Barkensjo formed death metal band The Curse in 2011. In 2013 Barkensjo left The Curse and by next year had formed LIK, also a death metal band.

Discography
 Promo 99 (Demo, 1999)
 Kaamos (7", 1999)
 Curse of Aeons (Demo 2001. Vinyl 10", 2004)
 Kaamos (CD, LP, 2002)
 Lucifer Rising (CD, LP, 2005)
 ''Scales Of Leviathan (CD, 2007)

Members 
 Karl Envall - vocals, bass guitar (1999–2006)
 Nicklas Eriksson - guitar (1998–2006)
 Konstantin Papavassilou - guitar (1998–2006)
 Cristofer Barkensjö (Chris Piss) - drums (2000–2006) (Grave, Face Down)

Former members
 Johan Thörngren - vocals, bass guitar (1998–1999)
 Thomas Åberg - drums (1998–2000)

References

External links
 Official website

Swedish death metal musical groups
Musical groups established in 1998
Candlelight Records artists